Thamnasteria is a genus of extinct stony corals.

Species 
The following species of Thamnasteria have been described:

 T. abukumaensis
 T. andranomarivensis
 T. aspera
 T. bevoayensis
 T. bonanomii
 T. communis
 T. concinna
 T. concinnaformis
 T. coquandi
 T. cotteaui
 T. defrancei
 T. dendroidea
 T. dumonti
 T. felixi
 T. globosa
 T. gracilis
 T. heterogenea
 T. hoffmeisteri
 T. huzimotoi
 T. imlayi
 T. iranensis
 T. jaccardi
 T. japonica
 T. jezoensis
 T. kobyi
 T. latistellata
 T. leptopetala
 T. lobata
 T. loryi
 T. lyelli
 T. maeandra
 T. mammosa
 T. matsushitai
 T. mettensis
 T. microconos
 T. miyakoensis
 T. moreana
 T. naumanni
 T. nicoleti
 T. ogawaensis
 T. patina
 T. pseudopaliformis
 T. racemosa
 T. rhaetica
 T. rumignyensis
 T. scita
 T. seriata
 T. settsassi
 T. sinuata
 T. sinuosa
 T. smithi
 T. tenuissima
 T. terquemi
 T. tokushimaensis
 T. tonantzinae
 T. torinosuensis
 T. yuraensis

 Fossil records 
This genus is known in the fossil record from the Triassic to the Eocene (from about 247.2 to 33.9 million years ago). Fossils of species within this genus have been found in Europe, United States, Canada, China, Japan, Pakistan, Colombia (Coquina Group, La Guajira), India, Thailand, Indonesia, Jordan, Lebanon, Egypt, Madagascar, Russia, Ukraine, Mexico and Peru. M. LeSauvage, the author of the
genus was a physician in Caen. He wrote numerous papers on medical subjects but his other interest was palaeontology and especially the fossils of Calcaires de Caen the type locality of the genus Thamnasteria''.

See also 

 List of prehistoric hexacorals

References

Scleractinia
Prehistoric Hexacorallia genera
Triassic first appearances
Eocene genus extinctions
Jurassic animals of Africa
Jurassic animals of Asia
Jurassic animals of Europe
Jurassic animals of North America
Jurassic animals of South America
Jurassic Argentina
Jurassic Chile
Jurassic Colombia
Jurassic Peru
Cretaceous animals of Asia
Cretaceous animals of Europe
Cretaceous animals of North America
Paleogene animals of Europe
Paleogene animals of North America
Fossil taxa described in 1823